This is a list of flag bearers who have represented Israel at the Olympics.

Flag bearers carry the national flag of their country at the opening and closing ceremonies of the Olympic Games.

References

Israel at the Olympics
Israel
Olympics

he:ישראל במשחקים האולימפיים#נושאי דגל ישראל בטקס הפתיחה